John Sloss (born 1956) is an entertainment lawyer, film sales agent, and manager, who has produced or executive produced over 50 films including the Academy Award-winning The Fog of War, Boys Don't Cry and Boyhood. Other credits include Bernie, City of Hope, Friends with Kids, A Scanner Darkly, Far From Heaven, and Before Sunrise.

Through his companies, Sloss Eckhouse LawCo and Cinetic Media, he has facilitated the sale or financing of over 600 films such as Lee Daniels' Precious, Napoleon Dynamite, The Kids Are All Right, Little Miss Sunshine, and Super Size Me.
Filmmakers with whom he has worked include Richard Linklater, Kevin Smith, Whit Stillman, Todd Haynes, Brad Anderson and Justin Lin.

Sloss has worked with companies such as Cinetic Media, Sloss Eckhouse LawCo LLP, Producers Distribution Agency.

In 2009, Sloss co-founded Filmbuff, a digital distribution company. In 2010, he co-founded Producers Distribution Agency which has released the films Banksy's Exit Through the Gift Shop, Senna, The Way, and Brooklyn Castle. Sloss has also served as an adjunct professor in the Graduate film program at Tisch School of the Arts at New York University.

References

External links 
 
 John Sloss Faculty Directory page at NYU Tisch
 Cinetic Media website
 Sloss Eckhouse LawCo website
 FilmBuff website

1956 births
Living people
American film producers
University of Michigan Law School alumni